The 2016 Oklahoma State Cowboys baseball team represents Oklahoma State University during the 2016 NCAA Division I baseball season. The Cowboys play their home games at Allie P. Reynolds Stadium as a member of the Big 12 Conference. They are led by head coach Josh Holliday, in his fourth season at Oklahoma State.

Previous season
The 2015 Oklahoma State Cowboys baseball team notched a 38–20 (14–8) regular season record and finished second in the Big 12 Conference standings. The Cowboys reached the 2015 Big 12 Conference baseball tournament championship game, where they fell to Texas. Oklahoma State received an at-large bid to the 2015 NCAA Division I baseball tournament and was selected as one of the sixteen Regional hosts. The Cowboys were eliminated from the NCAA tournament with losses to Arkansas and St. John's (NY).

Personnel

Roster

Coaching staff

Schedule and results

|-
! style="background:#FF6600;color:white;"| Regular Season (35–18)
|- valign="top" 

|- bgcolor="#ffbbbb"
| February 19 || 11:00 am || || at * || #25 || Clay Gould Ballpark • Arlington, TX || L2–3 || Kuhnel(1–0) || Cobb(0–1) || James(1) || 647 || 0–1 || –
|- bgcolor="#bbffbb"
| February 20 || 11:00 am || || * || #25 || Clay Gould Ballpark • Arlington, TX || W8–2 || Reed(1–0) || Starks(0–1) || – || 664 || 1–1 || –
|- bgcolor="#bbffbb"
| February 20 || 2:30 pm || || at Texas–Arlington* || #25 || Clay Gould Ballpark • Arlington, TX || W5–3 || Elliott(1–0) || Wilcox(0–1) || Mertz(1) || 1,063 || 2–1 || –
|- bgcolor="#ffbbbb"
| February 21 || 11:00 am || || Stephen F. Austin* || #25 || Clay Gould Ballpark • Arlington, TX || L4–510 || Adams(1–0) || Reed(1–1) || – || 683 || 2–2 || –
|- bgcolor="#ffbbbb"
| February 26 || 2:00 pm || || at #13 * ||  || Boshamer Stadium • Chapel Hill, NC || L1–2 || Williams(1–0) || Buffett(0–1) || – || 1,286 || 2–3 || –
|- bgcolor="#ffbbbb"
| February 27 || 1:00 pm || || at #13 North Carolina* ||  || Boshamer Stadium • Chapel Hill, NC || L6–710 || Aker(2–1) || Cobb(0–2) || – || 1,793 || 2–4 || –
|- bgcolor="#ffbbbb"
| February 28 || 11:00 am || || at #13 North Carolina* ||  || Boshamer Stadium • Chapel Hill, NC || L3–4 || Butler(1–0) || Cobb(0–3) || – || 1,828 || 2–5 || –
|-

|- bgcolor="#bbffbb"
| March 1 || 4:00 pm || COX || * ||  || Allie P. Reynolds Stadium • Stillwater, OK || W7–1 || Teel(1–0) || Preiss(0–1) || – || 734 || 3–5 || –
|- bgcolor="#bbffbb"
| March 2 || 4:00 pm || COX || Incarnate Word* ||  || Allie P. Reynolds Stadium • Stillwater, OK || W3–2 || Buffett(1–1) || Moszkowicz(0–1) || Cobb(1) || 508 || 4–5 || –
|- bgcolor="#bbffbb"
| March 4 || 4:00 pm || COX || * ||  || Allie P. Reynolds Stadium • Stillwater, OK || W1–0 || Buffett(2–1) || McKinney(1–1) || Cobb(2) || 745 || 5–5 || –
|- bgcolor="#bbffbb"
| March 5 || 2:00 pm || COX || Indiana State* ||  || Allie P. Reynolds Stadium • Stillwater, OK || W9–2 || Battenfield(1–0) || Peterson(2–1) || Reed(1) || 702 || 6–5 || –
|- bgcolor="#ffbbbb"
| March 6 || 1:00 pm || COX || Indiana State* ||  || Allie P. Reynolds Stadium • Stillwater, OK || L0–2 || Hill(2–0) || Mertz(0–1) || McKinney(1) || 588 || 6–6 || –
|- bgcolor="#bbffbb"
| March 8 || 3:00 pm || || at #12 * ||  || Hammons Field • Springfield, MO || W6–510 || Cobb(1–3) || Young(0–1) || – || 505 || 7–6 || –
|- bgcolor="#bbffbb"
| March 11 || 4:00 pm || COX || * ||  || Allie P. Reynolds Stadium • Stillwater, OK || W8–2 || Hatch(1–0) || Carroll2–2 || – || 411 || 8–6 || –
|- bgcolor="#bbffbb"
| March 12 || 2:00 pm || COX || Abilene Christian* ||  || Allie P. Reynolds Stadium • Stillwater, OK || W16–0 || Elliott(2–0) || deMeyere(2–1) || – || 555 || 9–6 || –
|- bgcolor="#bbffbb"
| March 14 || 2:00 pm || COX || Abilene Christian* ||  || Allie P. Reynolds Stadium • Stillwater, OK || W8–4 || Cobb(2–3) || Mason(3–1) || – || 385 || 10–6 || –
|- bgcolor="#bbffbb"
| March 15 || 6:30 pm || || at #26 * ||  || Horner Ballpark • Dallas, TX || W7–6 || Buffett(3–1) || Johnson(2–1) || Battenfield(1) || 1,321 || 11–6 || –
|- bgcolor="#bbffbb"
| March 18 || 4:00 pm || COX || #24 * ||  || Allie P. Reynolds Stadium • Stillwater, OK || W6–3 || Reed(2–1) || Jaskie(3–1) || Battenfield(2) || 377 || 12–6 || –
|- bgcolor="#bbffbb"
| March 19 || 2:00 pm || COX || #24 Michigan* ||  || Allie P. Reynolds Stadium • Stillwater, OK || W5–4 || Cobb(3–3) || Adcock(1–2) || Buffett(1) || 919 || 13–6 || –
|- bgcolor="#ffbbbb"
| March 20 || 1:00 pm || COX || #24 Michigan* ||  || Allie P. Reynolds Stadium • Stillwater, OK || L2–4 || Hill(3–1) || Elliott(2–1) || Pall(3) || 551 || 13–7 || –
|- bgcolor="#bbffbb"
| March 22 || 6:30 pm || || at * ||  || Eck Stadium • Wichita, KS || W17–0 || Mertz(1–1) || Williams(0–2) || – || 2,548 || 14–7 || –
|- bgcolor="#bbffbb"
| March 24 || 6:05 pm || FS1 || at Kansas State ||  || Tointon Family Stadium • Manhattan, KS || W2–1 || Hatch(2–0) || MaVorhis(3–1) || Buffett(2) || 1,884 || 15–7 || 1–0
|- bgcolor="#bbffbb"
| March 25 || 6:35 pm || FCS || at Kansas State ||  || Tointon Family Stadium • Manhattan, KS || W5–4 || Williams(1–0) || Rigler(2–4) || Buffett(3) || 2,337 || 16–7 || 2–0
|- bgcolor="#bbffbb"
| March 26 || 1:05 pm || ESPN3 || at Kansas State ||  || Tointon Family Stadium • Manhattan, KS || W5-410 || Buffett(4–1) || Benenati(0–1) || – || 2,006 || 17–7 || 3–0
|- bgcolor="#bbffbb"
| March 29 || 6:30 pm || FSSW+ || Arkansas* ||  || Allie P. Reynolds Stadium • Stillwater, OK || W5–4 || Reed(3–1) || Willey(0–1) || Buffett(4) || 2,418 || 18–7 || –
|-

|- bgcolor="#ffbbbb"
| April 1 || 5:30 pm || || at West Virginia ||  || Monongalia County Ballpark • Granville, WV || L4–510 || Smith(1–0) || Battenfield(1–1) || – || 1,818 || 18–8 || 3–1
|- bgcolor="#ffbbbb"
| April 2 || 3:00 pm || || at West Virginia ||  || Monongalia County Ballpark • Granville, WV || L3–4 || Vance(4–1) || Cobb(3–4) || Dotson(1) || 1,467 || 18–9 || 3–2
|- bgcolor="#bbffbb"
| April 3 || 12:00 pm || || at West Virginia ||  || Monongalia County Ballpark • Granville, WV || W8–1 || Elliott(3–1) || Myers(2–3) || – || 951 || 19–9 || 4–2
|- bgcolor="#ffbbbb"
| April 8 || 6:00 pm || FSSW+ || #19 Texas Tech ||  || Allie P. Reynolds Stadium • Stillwater, OK || L1–5 || Moseley(3–2) || Hatch(2–1) || – || 1,977 || 19–10 || 4–3
|- bgcolor="#ffbbbb"
| April 9 || 3:00 pm || COX || #19 Texas Tech ||  || Allie P. Reynolds Stadium • Stillwater, OK || L2–8 || Dugger(3–0) || Cobb(3–5) || – || 2,855 || 19–11 || 4–4
|- bgcolor="#ffbbbb"
| April 10 || 1:00 pm || FCS || #19 Texas Tech ||  || Allie P. Reynolds Stadium • Stillwater, OK || L5–157 || Harpenau(1–0) || Elliott(3–2) || – || 1,258 || 19–12 || 4–5
|- bgcolor="#ffbbbb"
| April 12 || 6:00 pm || FSSW+ || * ||  || Allie P. Reynolds Stadium • Stillwater, OK || L0–4 || McMinn(3–2) || Mertz(1–2) || – || 1,157 || 19–13 || 4–5
|- bgcolor="#bbffbb"
| April 15 || 6:30 pm || FSSW+ || at Baylor ||  || Baylor Ballpark • Waco, TX || W6–212 || Buffett(5–1) || Heineman(2–3) || – || 2,963 || 20–13 || 5–5
|- bgcolor="#bbffbb"
| April 16 || 1:00 pm || FSSW || at Baylor ||  || Baylor Ballpark • Waco, TX || W10–7 || Cobb(4–5) || Tolson(4–2) || – || 2,546 || 21–13 || 6–5
|- bgcolor="#bbffbb"
| April 16 || 5:00 pm || || at Baylor ||  || Baylor Ballpark • Waco, TX || W3–1 || Elliott(4–2) || Hill(1–2) || Buffett(5) || 2,776 || 22–13 || 7–5
|- bgcolor="#bbffbb"
| April 19 || 6:00 pm || FCS Atlantic || at Oklahoma* ||  || L. Dale Mitchell Baseball Park • Norman, OK || W(4–3) || Lienhard(1–0) || Irvin(2–1) || Buffett(6) || 1,792 || 23–13 || 7–5
|- bgcolor="#bbffbb"
| April 22 || 6:00 pm || FCS || #8 TCU ||  || Allie P. Reynolds Stadium • Stillwater, OK || W(9–0) || Hatch(3–1) || Janczak(4–3) || – || 1,758 || 24–13 || 8–5
|- bgcolor="#ffbbbb"
| April 23 || 4:00 pm || FSSW+ || #8 TCU ||  || Allie P. Reynolds Stadium • Stillwater, OK || L6–11 || Horton(7–0) || Cobb(4–6) ||  Guillory(1) || 1,988 || 24–14 || 8–6
|- bgcolor="#bbffbb"
| April 24 || 1:00 pm || FCS || #8 TCU ||  || Allie P. Reynolds Stadium • Stillwater, OK || W11–7 || Elliott(5–2) || Howard(5–2) || Buffett(7) || 1,296 || 25–14 || 9–6
|- bgcolor="#ffbbbb"
| April 26 || 5:00 pm || SECN+ || at Arkansas* || #25 || Baum Stadium • Fayetteville, AR || L6–7 || Teague(3–3) || Cowan(0–1) || Knight(1) || 7,164 || 25–15 || 9–6
|- bgcolor="#bbffbb"
| April 30 || 2:30 pm || LHN || at Texas || #25 || UFCU Disch–Falk Field • Austin, TX || W3–0 || Hatch(4–1) || Cooper(2–3) || – ||  || 26–15 || 10–6
|- bgcolor="#bbffbb"
| April 30 || 3:30 pm || LHN || at Texas || #25 || UFCU Disch–Falk Field • Austin, TX || W6–2 || Elliott(6–2) || Culbreth(8–3) || Buffett(8) || 6,312 || 27–15 || 11–6
|-

|- bgcolor="#bbffbb"
| May 1 || 1:30 pm || LHN || at Texas || #25 || UFCU Disch–Falk Field • Austin, TX || W8–4 || Hackerott(1–0) || Shugart(1–2) || – || 5,484 || 28–15 || 12–6
|- bgcolor="#bbffbb"
| May 6 || 6:00 pm || COX || * || #16 || Allie P. Reynolds Stadium • Stillwater, OK || W9–0 || Hatch(5–1) || Williams(2–8) || – || 677 || 29–15 || 12–6
|- bgcolor="#bbffbb"
| May 7 || 3:00 pm || COX || Prairie View A&M* || #16 || Allie P. Reynolds Stadium • Stillwater, OK || W12–0 || Elliott(7–2) || Philpott(1–8) || – || 632 || 30–15 || 12–6
|- bgcolor="#bbffbb"
| May 10 || 6:00 pm || FSSW+ || Dallas Baptist* || #12 || Allie P. Reynolds Stadium • Stillwater, OK || W8–7 || Buffett(6–1) || Fouse(0–1) || – || 627 || 31–15 || 12–6
|- bgcolor="#ffbbbb"
| May 13 || 6:30 pm || ESPNU || Oklahoma || #12 || Bricktown Ballpark • Oklahoma City, OK || L1–9 || Irvin(5–1) || Hatch(5–2) || – || 7,302 || 31–16 || 12–7
|- bgcolor="#bbffbb"
| May 14 || 7:30 pm || FSSW+ || Oklahoma || #12 || ONEOK Field • Tulsa, OK || W10–9 || Costello(1–0) || Hansen(1–5) || Mertz(2) || 8,007 || 32–16 || 13–7
|- bgcolor="#ffbbbb"
| May 15 || 2:00 pm || FSSW+ || Oklahoma || #12 || ONEOK Field • Tulsa, OK || L1–3 || Grove(2–0) || Cobb(4–7) || Neuse(5) || 6,084 || 32–17 || 13–8
|- bgcolor="#ffbbbb"
| May 17 || 6:30 pm || || at Oral Roberts* || #14 || J. L. Johnson Stadium • Tulsa, OK || L1–3 || McCutchin(3–2) || Buffett(6–2) || Womacks(13) || 1,839 || 32–18 || 13–8
|- bgcolor="#bbffbb"
| May 20 || 2:00 pm || COX || Kansas || #14 || Allie P. Reynolds Stadium • Stillwater, OK || W4–3 || Hatch(6–2) || Davis(1–1) || Buffett(9) ||  || 33–18 || 14–8
|- bgcolor="#bbffbb"
| May 20 || 6:00 pm || FSSW+ || Kansas || #14 || Allie P. Reynolds Stadium • Stillwater, OK || W9–2 || Elliott(8–2) || Krauth(5–6) || – || 918 || 34–18 || 15–8
|- bgcolor="#bbffbb"
| May 21 || 3:00 pm || FSO || Kansas || #14 || Allie P. Reynolds Stadium • Stillwater, OK || W8–1 || Williams(2–0) || Weiman(2–7) || – || 1,033 || 35–18 || 16–8
|-

|- 
! style="background:#FF6600;color:white;"| Postseason
|- 

|- bgcolor="#bbffbb"
| May 25 || 7:30 pm || FCS || (7) Texas || (2) || Bricktown Ballpark • Oklahoma City, OK || W10–4 || Reed(4–1) || Culbreth8–4 || Mertz(3) || 4,850 || 36–18 || 1–0
|- bgcolor="#ffbbbb"
| May 26 || 7:30 pm || FCS || (3) TCU || (2) || Bricktown Ballpark • Oklahoma City, OK || L5–13 || Guillory(4–2) || Buffett(6–3) || – || 4,296 || 36–19 || 1–1
|- bgcolor="#ffbbbb"
| May 26 || 7:00 pm || FCS || (7) Texas || (2) || Bricktown Ballpark • Oklahoma City, OK || L8–12 || Ridgeway(0–3) || Mertz(1–3) || – || 5,593 || 36–20 || 1–2
|-

|- bgcolor="#bbffbb"
| June 3 || 11:00 am || ESPNU || (3) Nebraska || (2) || Doug Kingsmore Stadium • Clemson, SC || W6–0 || Hatch(7–2) || Waldron(7–3) || – || 4,013 || 37–20 || 1–0
|- bgcolor="#bbffbb"
| June 4 || 6:00 pm || ESPNU || at (1) Clemson || (2) || Doug Kingsmore Stadium • Clemson, SC || W12–2 || Buffett(7–3) || Schmidt(8–5) || – || 5,629 || 38–20 || 2–0
|- bgcolor="#bbffbb"
| June 5 || 8:10 pm || ESPN3 || at (1) Clemson || (2) || Doug Kingsmore Stadium • Clemson, SC || W9–2 || Elliott(9–2) || Krall(10–2) || Cobb(3) || 4,407 || 39–20 || 3–0
|-

|- bgcolor="#bbffbb"
| June 11 || 2:00 pm || ESPN2 || at #6 South Carolina || #12 || Founders Park • Columbia, SC || W5–1 || Hatch(8–2) || Webb(10–6) || Cobb(4) || 7,840 || 40–20 || 1–0
|- bgcolor="#bbffbb"
| June 12 || 2:00 pm || ESPN2 || at #6 South Carolina || #12 || Founders Park • Columbia, SC || W3–1 || Buffett(8–3) || Schmidt(9–5) || Cobb(5) || 7,677 || 41–20 || 2–0
|-

|- bgcolor="#bbffbb"
| June 18 || 2:00 pm || ESPN2 || #8 UCSB || #6 || TD Ameritrade Park • Omaha, NE || W1–0 || Hatch(9–2) || Bieber(12–4) || – || 20,956 || 42–20 || 1–0
|- bgcolor="#bbffbb"
| June 20 || 6:00 pm || ESPN || #7 Arizona || #6 || TD Ameritrade Park • Omaha, NE || W1–0 || Buffett(9–3) || Dalbec(10–5) || Cobb(6) || 22,981 || 43–20 || 2–0
|- bgcolor="#ffbbbb"
| June 24 || 2:00 pm || ESPN2 || #7 Arizona || #6 || TD Ameritrade Park • Omaha, NE || L3–9 || Ginkel(5–1) || Elliott(9–3) || Ming(4) || 16,549 || 43–21 || 2–1
|- bgcolor="#ffbbbb"
| June 25 || 2:00 pm || ESPN2 || #7 Arizona || #6 || TD Ameritrade Park • Omaha, NE || L1–5 || Dalbec(11–5) || Hatch(9–3) || Rivas(3) || 9,326 || 43–22 || 2–2
|-

|-
| Legend:       = Win       = Loss      Bold = Oklahoma State team member
|-
| "#" represents ranking. All rankings from Collegiate Baseball on the date of the contest."()" represents postseason seeding in the Big 12 Tournament or NCAA Regional, respectively.
|-

Rankings

References

Oklahoma State Cowboys
Oklahoma State Cowboys baseball seasons
Oklahoma State
College World Series seasons